is a Japanese voice actor who was born in Tokyo. He was associated with Trias Production, and is now with Artist Crew. He has voiced in a number of anime shows and video games. Some of his lead roles include Manabu Yuuki in The Galaxy Railways, Mythos in Princess Tutu, Renji Hiiragi in Night Wizard, Cacao in Trouble Chocolate, Moses in Blood+ and Gyro Robo in Machine Robo Rescue. He heads a production company called FreeMarch.

Filmography

Anime

Video games

Dubbing
Mikoto Yutaka in The Day of Revolution
Cubit Foxtar Mega Man Zero 3
Edd (Double D) in Ed, Edd n Eddy (Japanese dub)
Baby Sylvester in Baby Looney Tunes (Japanese dub)
Uwasa no Futari (Hiroshi Akabane)

Drama CDs

References

External links
  
 Official agency profile at Artist Crew 
 
 Naoki Yanagi at Ryu's Seiyuu Infos

1996 births
Living people
Male actors from Tokyo
Japanese male voice actors